— originally subtitled Emergence — is a hentai manga written by American-Japanese mangaka Shindo L. Originally published between 2013 and 2016 through Comic X-Eros, it gained a following online for its grim and depressing storyline and has become an Internet meme.

Plot
Saki Yoshida, a first-year high school student with no social life decides to change after graduating from middle school by getting a makeover. On her first day of high school, she makes two friends and spends time with them after school. After parting ways, she goes to a convenience store, when she encounters a man who compliments her appearance and invites her to a karaoke box. In the karaoke box, he gives Saki alcohol and drugs and rapes her, lying to her that he is only doing it because he loves her. After raping her, he puts his cell phone number in her phone. On her way home after regaining consciousness, she receives a message from the man revealing his name to be Hayato. The two start dating, where she quickly gets addicted to having sex while on drugs.

Back at school while chatting with her peers, when she lets slip that she is not as well off as she appears, a school acquaintance recommends compensated dating, also known as sugaring or sugar dating. Saki accepts, and at the weekend she takes an appointment with an older man named Kumagai. After having dinner with Kumagai, she is driven to a hotel where she is paid cash for sex with him. Ridden with guilt, she comes home late and breaks down, with her mother reassuring her that she will always be on her daughter's side.

At school, Saki is approached by some male students who show her a photo of her with Kumagai. They then blackmail her for sexual favors. Saki's father is laid off, and afterward drinks heavily and then rapes his daughter in her room. Her mother finds out about the rape from the perspective of the father, who has spun the story to imply that Saki seduced him. Betraying her earlier promise, Saki's mother does not allow her to explain herself and beats her. In response, Saki runs away from home.

Having lost her home, Saki drops out of high school and pursues a life with Hayato, who has accumulated eight million yen in debt at a local heroin bar. She vows to help pay back the debt to the bar owner, Mr. Obata, who threatens to kill Hayato if he does not repay. She does not have the money to pay upfront, and bar patrons seize the opportunity to pay her for sex work so that she may make up the difference. She is then pierced and tattooed by Hayato.

Saki, who now has the appearance of a gyaru, becomes pregnant after various sexual encounters. Hayato convinces her to abort the pregnancy and she soon finds herself returning to Kumagai, who, unimpressed with her body modifications, forces her to do increasingly degrading things to make the money she needs. 

Mr. Obata sexually assaults Saki with other workers at the bar and injects heroin into her to make her more compliant. She quickly develops an addiction, and begins to forget about paying off Hayato's debt in favour of buying drugs. When Saki is robbed and Hayato only finds drugs in her wallet, he becomes enraged, abandoning her and leaving her homeless.

Found by other homeless people in a public park, she is raped while under the influence. The following day, Saki realizes she is pregnant again and decides to carry the baby to term, vowing to quit drugs and change for the better in the process. She continues her prostitution for money, at the expense of her baby's well-being. Now in constant pain, she resumes her heroin use.

Saki builds up some savings to help with the cost of her unborn child, which she stores in a duffel bag in a public coin locker. She runs into her former classmates, who assume that the money is stolen, not believing that Saki could have earned so much money on her own. They rape her with various objects and beat her stomach, intending to kill the baby, and steal the money. She stumbles into a public bathroom, bleeding profusely, and looks at herself in the mirror. Horrified at the person she's become, she shatters the mirror, and presumably commits suicide by overdosing on her entire remaining volume of heroin. The story ends with a glimpse at what Saki's future life may have looked like had she been able to carry the baby to term, followed by a shot of Saki's glasses laying on the bathroom floor among drops of blood.

Publication
Henshin was first serialized in Japan in Comic X-Eros from July 26, 2013 to March 26, 2016. It was later published in tankōbon format on May 31, 2016, and a paperback version was published on 30 June 2016. It was published in English as Metamorphosis by FAKKU digitally on 27 October 2016 and physically in February 2017; a hardbound edition subtitled "Hard Edition" was announced at Anime Expo 2022 for a scheduled release in December 2022.

Reception
Reviewers have described Metamorphosis as highly depressing and disturbing to read, albeit while also praising the storyline and editorial quality. One reviewer was more critical, criticizing the sex scenes for seemingly serving no purpose except to be transgressive, and questioned the value of the work, failing to see any underlying message or moral.

Some manga artists have created derivative works based on Metamorphosis.

Analysis
Shindo L claimed he "originally had Kafka in mind" when he thought up the title, inspired by the short story of the same name, drawing comparisons to the dark themes and plots surrounding transformation. He also writes in the manga's afterword that he intended Metamorphosis to portray the "charm" of a miserable female main character.

Publications

References

Hentai anime and manga
Child sexual abuse in fiction
Drama anime and manga
Prostitution in comics
Fictional drug addicts
Rape in fiction
Internet memes
Internet memes introduced in 2016